Sirmur (also spelled as Sirmor, Sirmaur, Sirmour, or Sirmoor) was an independent kingdom in India, founded in 1616, located in the region that is now the Sirmaur district of Himachal Pradesh. The state was also known as Nahan, after its main city, Nahan. The state ranked  predominant amongst the Punjab hill States. It had an area of 4,039 km2 and a revenue of 300,000 rupees in 1891.

History
Nahan, the predecessor state of Sirmur, was founded by Soba Rawal in 1095 AD  who assumed the name Raja Subans Prakash. The new capital was founded in 1621 by Raja Karam Prakash, and the state was renamed to Sirmur.

Sirmur was surrounded by the hill states of Balsan and Jubbal in the North, Dehradun district in the East, Ambala district in the South West, and the states of Patiala and Keonthal in the North-West.

But by chance, shortly after this event a prince of Jaisalmer visited Haridwar as a pilgrim, and was invited by one of the minstrels of the Sirmoor kingdom to become its sovereign. He accordingly sent a force under his son, the Rawal or prince Sobha, who put down the disorders which had arisen in the state, and became the first Räjã of Sirmur, under the title of Subhans Parkash, a title which the Rajãs have ever since retained.

Rajban became the capital of the new king in 1095. The eighth Rãjã conquered Ratesh, later a part of the Keonthal State, about 1150 and his successor subdued Jubbal, Balsan, Kumharsain, Ghond, Kot, and Theog, thus extending his dominions almost to the Sutlej. For many years these territories remained feudatories of the State; but its capital was at Kälsi, in Dehra Dun, and the Rajas’ hold over their northern fiefs appears to have been weak until in the fourteenth century Bir Parkash fortified Hãth-Koti, on the confines of Jubbal, Retwain, and Sahri, the last of which became the capital of the State for a time.

Eventually in 1621 Karm Parkash founded Nahan, the modern capital. His successor, Mandhata, was called upon to aid Khalil-ullah, the general of the emperor Shah Jahan, in his invasion of Garhwãl, and his successor, Sobhag Parkãsh, received a grant of Kotaha in reward for this service. Under Aurangzeb this Rãjä again joined in operations against Garhwãl. His administration was marked by a great development of the agricultural resources of the State, and the tract of Kolagarh was also entrusted to him by the emperor.

Budh Parkãsh, the next ruler, recovered Pinjaur for Aurangzeb’s foster-brother. Raja Mit Parkãsh gave an asylum to the Sikh Guru, Gobind Singh, permitting him to fortify Paonta in the Kiarda Dun; and it was at Bhangani in the Dun that the Guru defeated the Rajäs of Kahlur and Garhwäl in 1688. But in 1710 Kirat Parkãsh, after defeating the Räja of Garhwal, captured Naraingarh, Morni, Pinjaur, and other territories from the Sikhs, and concluded an alliance with Amar Singh, Raja of Patiala, whom he aided in suppressing his rebellious Wazir; and he also fought in alliance with the Raja of Kahlür when Ghuläm Kãdir Khan, Rohilla, invaded that State. He supported the Rajã of Garhwãl in his resistance to the Gurkha invasion, and, though deserted by his ally, was able to compel the Gurkhas to agree to the Ganges as the boundary of their dominions. His son, Dharm Parkãsh, repulsed the encroachments of the chief of Nalagarh and an invasion by the Rãjã of Garhwãl, only to fall fighting in single combat with Rãjã Sansãr Chand of Kangra who had invaded Kalhur, in 1793.

He was succeeded by his brother, Karm Parkãsh, a weak ruler, whose misconduct caused a serious revolt. To suppress this he rashly invoked the aid of the Gurkhas, who promptly seized their opportunity and invaded Sirmür, expelled Ratn Parkash, whom the rebels had placed on the throne, and then refused to restore Karm Parkash. His queen, a princess of Goler and a lady of courage and resource, took matters into her own hands and invoked British aid. Her appeal coincided with the declaration of war against Nepal by the British, and a force was sent to expel the Gurkhas from Sirmür, On the conclusion of the Gurkha War the British Government placed Fateh Parkash, the minor son of Karm Parkãsh, on the throne, annexing all the territories east of the Jumna with Kotaha and the Kiãrda Dan. The Dun was, however, restored to the State in 1833 on payment of Rs.50,000. During the first Afghan War the Raja aided the British with a loan, and in the first Sikh War a Sirmur contingent fought at Hari-ka-pattan. Under Raja Sir Shamsher Parksh, G.C.S.I. (1856—98), the State progressed rapidly. Begar (forced labour) was abolished, roads were made, revenue and forest settlements carried out, a foundry, dispensaries, post and telegraph offices established. In 1857 the Raja rendered valuable services, and in 1880 during the Second Afghan War he sent a contingent to the north-west frontier. The Sirmür Sappers and Miners under his second son, Major Bir Bikram Singh, C.I.E., accompanied the Tirãh expedition in 1897.

Rulers
The rulers of Sirmur bore the title "Maharaja" from 1911 onward.

Demographics

Religion

Notes

References

Sirmaur district
Princely states of India
History of Himachal Pradesh
Rajputs
11th-century establishments in India
1095 establishments in Asia
1948 disestablishments in India
Princely states of Himachal Pradesh